The 2016–17 Florida Gulf Coast Eagles women's basketball team represented Florida Gulf Coast University (FGCU) in the 2016–17 NCAA Division I women's basketball season. The Eagles, led by 15th year head coach Karl Smesko, played their home games at Alico Arena and were members of the Atlantic Sun Conference. They finish the season 26–9, 12–2 in A-Sun play to finish in second place. They defeated North Florida, Jacksonville and Stetson to become champions of the ASUN Tournament and received an automatic bid to the NCAA women's tournament where they lost to Miami (FL) in the first round.

Media
All home games and conference road will be shown on ESPN3 or A-Sun.TV. Road games will also be broadcast on the FGCU Portal.

Roster

Schedule

|-
!colspan=9 style="background:#00885A; color:#00287A;"| Non-conference regular season

|-
!colspan=9 style="background:#00885A; color:#00287A;"| Atlantic Sun regular season

|-
!colspan=9 style="background:#00885A; color:#00287A;"| Atlantic Sun Women's Tournament

|-
!colspan=9 style="background:#00885A; color:#00287A;"| NCAA Women's Tournament

Rankings

See also
 2016–17 Florida Gulf Coast Eagles men's basketball team

References

Florida Gulf Coast
Florida Gulf Coast Eagles women's basketball seasons
Florida Gulf Coast